Marchio is an Italian surname. Notable people with the surname include:

Fanny Marchiò (1904–1980), Italian actress
Luisa Marchio (born 1971), Italian footballer

See also
Francesco Maria Taliani de Marchio (1887-1968), Italian diplomat, and ambassador to China

Italian-language surnames